Bird Kingdom is an aviary in the tourist district of Niagara Falls, Ontario, Canada. Opened in May 2003, it is the largest free flying indoor aviary in the world. It is also home to  mammals, reptiles and amphibians which are part of educational programs. Bird Kingdom has been voted a top family attraction in Niagara Falls and was inducted into the Trip Advisor Hall of Fame in 2016.

Areas

Small Bird Aviary 

This section of the aviary houses smaller birds. The Small Aviary houses over fifty types of birds, among which are some endangered and rare species. It overlooks the Niagara Gorge, a well known bird watching spot and bird breeding ground.

Night Jungle 
An area where nocturnal animals can be seen. Egyptian Fruit Bats, Owls and other creatures of the night can be found in the ancient ruins of the night jungle.

Main Aviary 

Those birds represent approximately 80 species from around the globe, which live in the tropical environment. Visitors are able to feed lorikeets, and take self-guided tours.

Javanese House 
Bird Kingdom houses the only authentic Javanese nobleman's house in North America. The house was hand carved with solid teak wood and constructed without nails. In the 19th century, houses like this were for the aristocratic class. The front door of the house faces south, supposedly facing the sea. The intricate carving on the roof shows visitors that the house was for a nobleman.

History 

In 1908, the Spirella Corset Company built a four-story concrete building on the current site of the aviary. By 1958, the company had shrunk in size, resulting in the company's moving their location to a smaller facility. The building was purchased that year by Jacob Sherman, who owned the Niagara Falls Museum. Sherman then renovated the building extensively, adding a five-story viewing tower while also moving 700,000 artifacts to the building. It was discovered later that the museum had been home to the actual mummy of King Ramesses I. By that time of that discovery, however, the museum was closed and the mummy back in Egypt.

The museum was operated by the Sherman family until 1999, when the maintenance of the building and artifacts became too costly. Most of the artifacts were sold or returned to their place of origin. Larry Vann, a resident of the Niagara area, purchased the museum building. Over the next few years, $15 million was spent on renovations to the building. The renovations included a large addition to the south side of the old museum building. In June 2003, the building re-opened as Bird Kingdom at the Niagara Falls Aviary.

Gallery

Notes

External links 

Tour Information

Aviaries in Canada
Buildings and structures in Niagara Falls, Ontario
Tourist attractions in Niagara Falls, Ontario
Zoos in Ontario